Alexander is a yacht which was built in 1965 in Lubecker Flender shipyard. It was later refurbished in Germany for use as yacht charter. The yacht was owned by the Latsis family until 2015.

Design
The vessel is of steel construction with teak decks. Alexander is powered by two MAN diesel engines each creating . The vessel has a crew of 60.

Accommodation
Alexander accommodates her guests in 39 staterooms, 18 of which are double rooms, 7 twin, and one master. The yacht also has a suite for the yacht-owner, which consists of a living room, a bedroom, and a spacious bathroom. The yacht has a meeting hall, a conference hall, a private cinema, a large living room, and a small restaurant. There are two outside bars and two jacuzzis. The yacht has a helicopter pad.

See also 
 List of motor yachts by length

Notes

References

1965 ships
Motor yachts
Ships built in Lübeck